Luther Gean Hackman (born October 10, 1974) is an American former professional baseball pitcher. He played in Major League Baseball (MLB) for the Colorado Rockies, St. Louis Cardinals, and San Diego Padres, in the KBO League for the Samsung Lions, and in the Chinese Professional Baseball League (CPBL) for the Uni-President 7-Eleven Lions.

Career
Hackman was selected by Colorado Rockies in 6th round (154th overall) of the 1994 Major League Baseball Draft. He has played at the major league level for the Colorado Rockies, St. Louis Cardinals, and San Diego Padres.

In 2007, Hackman played nearly all of the season with the Nashville Sounds, the Triple-A affiliate of the Milwaukee Brewers. He was released from his contract on August 18, and then signed as a free agent by the Triple-A Oklahoma Redhawks on August 24.

In late October 2007, Hackman was given a 50-game suspension for violating the Minor League Drug Prevention and Treatment Program by testing positive for a performance-enhancing substance.

He signed with Uni-President 7-Eleven Lions of Taiwanese CPBL on July 1, 2008 and became a free agent at the end of the season (squad number:44). Then He joined with Olmecas de Tabasco of LMB in the beginning of 2009 until June 10, 2009.

After June 16, 2009, Hackman returned to the Uni-President 7-Eleven Lions, now wearing #00, and was Most Valuable Player in the 2009 Taiwan Series.

Aug. 14, 2010, Hackman was warned then later ejected by home plate umpire for repeatingly covering the pitching rubber with dirt.

References

External links

Career statistics and player information from the KBO League

1974 births
American expatriate baseball players in South Korea
American expatriate baseball players in Taiwan
American sportspeople in doping cases
Baseball players from Mississippi
Baseball players suspended for drug offenses
Bridgeport Bluefish players
Buffalo Bisons (minor league) players
Colorado Rockies players
KBO League pitchers
Living people
Major League Baseball pitchers
Nashville Sounds players
Samsung Lions players
San Diego Padres players
St. Louis Cardinals players
Uni-President 7-Eleven Lions players